Jack Burke (29 April 1918 – 17 January 2004) was  a former Australian rules footballer who played with Hawthorn in the Victorian Football League (VFL).

Notes

External links 

1918 births
2004 deaths
Australian rules footballers from Victoria (Australia)
Hawthorn Football Club players